This is a list of major classes of warship operated by the Royal Australian Navy. Included are capital ships, amphibious vessels, cruisers, destroyers and frigates.

Aircraft carriers
Following the Second World War, the RAN began a policy of blue water operations built around an aircraft carrier. Two light fleet carriers were purchased from the Royal Navy, one of which, was modified with all the latest enhancements in carrier design. Melbourne continued as the RAN's flagship until 1982, when it was planned to replace her with a STOVL carrier, again purchased from the Royal Navy. Soon after, the Australian Government decided to end aircraft carrier operations.

Conventional aircraft carriers

Seaplane carrier

Capital ships
When the RAN was first founded, it was decided that a capital ship would be constructed to serve as the fleet flagship. Initially conceived as a unit of the Royal Navy, the second Indefatigable-class battlecruiser was paid for and crewed by Australians, and was thus commissioned as HMAS Australia. Australia was the only true "capital ship" to serve in the RAN.

Battlecruiser

Amphibious assault shipping
 Landing Ship Infantry
 
 
 
 Mark III Landing Ship Tank – six ships
 Landing Craft Heavy
  - eight ships
 Heavy Landing Ship
 
 High Speed Catamaran

Cruisers

Heavy cruisers
 The RAN ordered two s in 1924 which were included with the Royal Navy's order for five; the loss of Canberra during the Second World War. Shropshire was transferred from the RN to the RAN to replace the lost ship.

Protected cruiser

Light cruisers
  – two ships
  – four ships
  – three ships

Destroyers
  (1910) – six ships
  (1919) – five ships
  (1919) – one ship
 V class (1933) – three ships
 W class (1933) – one ship
  (1933) – one ship
  (1940) – five ships
 Q class (1942) – five ships
  (1942) – three ships
  (1950) – two ships
  (1957) – four ships
  (1965) – three ships
  (2017) – three ships

Frigates
  (1943) – twelve ships
  (1961) – six ships
  (1980) – six ships
  (1996) – eight ships

Corvettes
 (1940) - fifty-six ships

Sloops
  – three ships
  – four ships

Footnotes

External links
 MaritimeQuest Royal Australian Navy Index
 Current Ships – Royal Australian Navy

Warship classes